Independence Manor is a Victorian/Gothic revival style home built in Sunnyside, Staten Island, New York in 1897.  It has been home to an all-girls private school in the late nineteenth century, and was a boarding house in the 1920s and 1930s.  It was later occupied by a law firm called Castorina & Associates, P.C.

Sources 
New York Public Library, Photography Collection.

Houses in Staten Island
Houses completed in 1897
Gothic Revival architecture in New York (state)